Risky Business is a 1983 American teen sex comedy drama film written and directed by Paul Brickman (in his directorial debut) and starring Tom Cruise and Rebecca De Mornay. Best known as Cruise's breakout film, Risky Business was a critical and commercial success, grossing more than $63 million against a $6.2 million budget.

Plot
High-achieving high school student Joel Goodsen lives with his wealthy parents in the Chicago North Shore area of Glencoe. His father wants him to attend Princeton University, his alma mater, so Joel participates in Future Enterprisers, an extracurricular activity in which students work in teams to create small businesses. 

When Joel's parents go away on a trip, his friend Miles convinces him to use his newfound freedom to have some fun. On the first night, Joel raids the liquor cabinet, plays the stereo loudly, joyrides in his father's car and dances around the living room in his briefs and button-down shirt to "Old Time Rock and Roll". 

The following day, Miles calls a prostitute named Jackie on Joel's behalf. Jackie turns out to be a male cross-dresser, so Joel pays her just to leave. But, as she's leaving, she gives Joel the number for another prostitute, Lana. That night, Joel is unable to sleep and hesitantly calls Lana, who is revealed as a gorgeous blonde woman, and they spend the entire night having sex.

The next morning, Lana asks Joel for $300 for her services. He goes to the bank, but when he returns, she is gone, along with his mother's expensive Steuben glass egg. Joel finds Lana and demands the egg back, but her pimp Guido interrupts them, pulling a gun. While in his father's Porsche 928, Joel is chased by Guido, but eventually escapes. 

Lana tells Joel that the egg is with the rest of her belongings at Guido's. He lets her stay at his house while he goes to school. When he returns, his friends have come over, and Lana has invited another prostitute, Vicki, to stay, but Joel rejects the idea. The women leave, only to encounter Guido and get into an altercation on Joel's front lawn before running back into his house. Joel agrees to the women spending one more night. 

Later that night, Joel, Lana, Vicki, and Joel's friend Barry go out and get high on marijuana. After Lana accidentally bumps the Porsche out of gear while retrieving her purse, the car rolls down the hill and onto a pier (despite Joel's desperate attempt to stop it); the pier collapses, and the Porsche sinks into Lake Michigan.

When Joel takes the car to a repair shop, he is horrified to learn how much fixing it will cost. He and Lana later decide to turn his parents' house into a brothel for a night; Joel's share of the profits will pay for the repairs. The party is hugely successful; the house is packed with Joel's friends and classmates and Lana's co-workers. 

However, the recruiter from Princeton, Rutherford, chooses that night to interview Joel for admission to Princeton. The interview is plagued by interruptions, and Rutherford is unimpressed by Joel's résumé. Afterwards, he stays at the party and becomes acquainted with Lana's friends. After the party, Joel and Lana make love on the Chicago "L".

The next morning, Joel finds his house has been burgled. When he tries to call Lana, Guido answers; he tells him he will let Joel buy back his furniture. Joel and his friends manage to get everything moved back in just as his parents walk in, though his mother notices a crack in her egg. Later, Joel's father congratulates him; the interviewer was very impressed, and Joel will be accepted into Princeton.

Joel meets Lana at a restaurant, and they speculate about their future. She tells him that she wants to keep on seeing him; he jokes that it will cost her.

Cast

Casting
Sean Penn, Gary Sinise, Kevin Bacon, John Cusack and Tom Hanks all auditioned for the role of Joel Goodsen. Michelle Pfeiffer was offered the role of Lana, but  turned it down.

Soundtrack

The film was scored by Tangerine Dream. Their music comprises nearly half of the soundtrack album. Also included are songs by Muddy Waters, Prince ("DMSR"), Jeff Beck, Journey, Phil Collins ("In the Air Tonight"), and the song for which the film is best known, "Old Time Rock and Roll" by Bob Seger.

The soundtrack album was released on Virgin Records, Tangerine Dream's record company at the time of the film's release.

The film also includes "Hungry Heart" by Bruce Springsteen, "Every Breath You Take" by The Police, and "Swamp" by Talking Heads. The LP and CD versions of the soundtrack include two different versions of "Love on a Real Train (Risky Business)," both of which are different recordings from the version used in the film for the final love scene or closing credits.

Reception

Box office
The film opened in 670 theaters, with an opening weekend gross of $4,275,327. It went on to gross a total of $63.5 million domestically.

Critical response
Risky Business was acclaimed by critics. It is also considered by many as one of the best films of 1983.
Janet Maslin, in her 1983 review of the film for The New York Times, called it "part satire, part would-be suburban poetry and part shameless showing off" and said the film "shows an abundance of style", though "you would be hard pressed to find a film whose hero's problems are of less concern to the world at large." She called De Mornay "disarming as a call girl who looks more like a college girl" and credits Cruise with making "Joel's transformation from straight arrow to entrepreneur about as credible as it can be made."

The film holds a 92% "Certified Fresh" rating on the review aggregate website Rotten Tomatoes based on 50 reviews, with an average of 7.40/10, with the site's consensus stating; "Featuring one of Tom Cruise's best early performances, Risky Business is a sharp, funny examination of teen angst that doesn't stop short of exploring dark themes". Roger Ebert's review was positive, calling it a film of: 

Variety said the film was like a "promising first novel, with all the pros and cons that come with that territory" and complimented Brickman on "the stylishness and talent of his direction."

Legacy
The remastered 25th-anniversary edition offers "both the upbeat studio ending and Mr. Brickman's original, more tentative and melancholic conclusion".

In 2015 the film was #31 on Entertainment Weeklys list of the 50 Best High School Movies. The magazine called the film a "sharp satire of privileged suburban teens", portraying the "soul-crushing pressure to be perfect."

In the years since the film's release, the iconic scene featuring Cruise's character sliding across the floor, dancing in just his pink shirt, socks, and white briefs to Bob Seger's rendition of "Old Time Rock and Roll" has been recreated in episodes of many television series, as well as in films, parodies, and advertisements. The song was #100 on AFI's 100 Years ... 100 Songs list.

References

External links

 
 
 
 
 
 

1983 films
1983 comedy films
1983 directorial debut films
1980s coming-of-age comedy films
1980s English-language films
1980s high school films
1980s satirical films
1980s sex comedy films
1980s teen comedy films
American coming-of-age comedy films
American high school films
American satirical films
American sex comedy films
American teen comedy films
Films about prostitution in the United States
Films about virginity
Films scored by Tangerine Dream
Films set in Chicago
Films shot in Chicago
The Geffen Film Company films
Teen sex comedy films
Warner Bros. films
1980s American films